M Squad is an American crime drama television series that ran from 1957 to 1960 on NBC. It was produced by Lee Marvin's Latimer Productions and Revue Studios. Its main sponsor was the Pall Mall cigarette brand; Lee Marvin, the program's star, appeared in its commercials during many episodes. Alternate sponsors were General Electric (GE), Hazel Bishop and Bulova watches.

Synopsis
Set in Chicago, Illinois, the show starred Marvin as Detective Lieutenant Frank Ballinger, a member of "M Squad", a special unit of the Chicago Police, assisting other units in battling organized crime, corruption and violent crimes citywide. Paul Newlan co-starred as his boss, Captain Grey. Although Marvin had been appearing in feature films since 1951, it was this series that made him a star, and he later went on to an even bigger film career afterward. Nelson Case was the announcer. The popularity  of M Squad was proven in the ratings wars by the NBC network choosing a Friday night time slot opposite Frank Sinatra's ABC variety show in the fall of 1957 and Phil Silvers' long running CBS comedy, Sgt. Bilko, in 1958. Both series were eventually cancelled.

Music
The theme music for the first season was composed by Stanley Wilson, who won the 1959 Grammy Award for the Best Soundtrack Album and Background Score from Motion Picture or Television. In the second and third seasons, the new theme was composed by Count Basie.

A soundtrack album, Music from M Squad, with liner notes by Lee Marvin, was released by RCA Victor Records in 1959 during the last season of the show.

Home media
Timeless Media Group released M Squad: The Complete Series on DVD in the Region 1 on November 11, 2008. This release has been discontinued and is out of print.

On November 4, 2014, Timeless Media re-released the complete series on DVD in a new 16-disc special edition collection that contains an entire disc of bonus content.

Episodes

Guest stars

 Roscoe Ates
 Joanna Barnes
 Charles Bronson
 Mike Connors
 Russ Conway
 Walter Coy
 Whitney Blake
 Paul Burke
 Terry Burnham (2 episodes)
 James Coburn
 Francis De Sales
 Angie Dickinson
 Joe Flynn
 Alan Hale, Jr.
 Ron Hayes
 Werner Klemperer
 Robert Knapp
 Tom Laughlin
 Ruta Lee
 DeForest Kelley
 Nan Leslie
 Dayton Lummis
 Tyler McVey
 Walter Maslow
 Carole Mathews
 Joyce Meadows
 Sid Melton
 John Mitchum
 Ed Nelson
 Leonard Nimoy
 J. Pat O'Malley
 Michael Pataki
 Burt Reynolds
 Don Rickles
 Janice Rule
 Barbara Stuart
 Mary Treen
 H. M. Wynant
 Rose Marie

Notes

In episode "The Jumper", an officer was depicted taking bribes. This prompted Richard J. Daley, the Mayor of Chicago at the time, to discourage motion picture and television location filming in Chicago for the rest of his administration (1955–1976). (He made an exception for the 1975 John Wayne film Brannigan, because of Daley's personal admiration for Wayne.) The Blues Brothers, released in 1980, marked the reversal of the policy under then-mayor Jane Byrne.

Lee Marvin as Lt. Frank Ballinger carried two Colt Cobra snub nosed revolvers, the lightweight variant of Colt's "Detective's Special" revolver, which was popular with detectives at the time.  Lt. Ballinger was the first T.V. police detective, of any note, to carry a backup revolver.  The second Cobra revolver was carried in a more concealed position than the other.

A novel was published in 1962, M Squad: The Chicago Cop Killer,  by David Saunders. It was published by Belmont Books, New York.

See also
 Police Squad!

References

External links
 

1957 American television series debuts
1960 American television series endings
1950s American crime drama television series
1960s American crime drama television series
Black-and-white American television shows
Fictional portrayals of the Chicago Police Department
NBC original programming
Television series by Universal Television
Television shows set in Chicago